The National Sewerage Program was an Australian federal program under the Whitlam and Fraser Governments established to provide funding for the expansion of municipal sewerage systems. At the time Australia was lagging behind other developed nations and, as of the commencement of the program in 1972, 17.2% of the Australian population were not connected to sewerage. Even in major population centers like Sydney and Melbourne, there was a backlog of over 318,000 homes waiting to be connected to municipal sewerage systems. The program was administered by the newly formed Department of Urban and Regional Development, and over AUD$330 million of funding was allocated to be distributed to individual states and territories over ten years. Over the life of the program the sewerage connection backlog was reduced by 30% to 40%. The program was abolished in 1977 by the incumbent Fraser Government. Consequently, many communities struggled to connect to sewerage for decades afterwards.

References 

Engineering projects
Public policy in Australia
1972 establishments in Australia
1977 disestablishments in Australia
Sewerage infrastructure in Australia